The Karate Guard is a 2005 American animated cartoon short film, and the 163rd Tom and Jerry short. Directed by Joseph Barbera (Tom and Jerry co-creator and co-founder of Hanna-Barbera) and Spike Brandt, The Karate Guard was the last Tom and Jerry cartoon that Barbera worked on before his death in 2006.

Plot 

Tom is taking a nap, but is suddenly awoken by Jerry. To check what the noise is coming from, Tom peeks through Jerry's mouse hole to find Jerry (dressed in a karate gi complete with a black belt) practicing karate with a punching bag resembling Tom. After Jerry finishes training, his spiritual mentor, who is a ghost-like figure, appears and asks him if he's ready to take on Tom, to which Jerry agrees. After Jerry walks out of his hole, he sees Tom at the end of a hallway and becomes afraid of him, until Tom starts to mock Jerry and laughs at the thought of Jerry defeating him. Jerry then decides to go and fight Tom, to which Tom pulls out a flyswatter and hits Jerry with it multiple times, then slingshots him with the flyswatter back to his hole where he runs into one of his walls. Jerry's spiritual mentor appears again and gives Jerry a gong to ring that summons a "Karate Guard" named Momo-sumo (played by Spike) to aid him whenever he needs help.

The remainder of the short deals with Tom's attempts to catch Jerry, but does not know about Momo-sumo first. As soon as Jerry rings the gong, Momo-sumo sticks out his arm as Tom yelps and spins. He is then tied to a lawnmower and is launched into a garbage truck. In the next scene, Jerry is seen sitting on a plate, eating cheese, and Tom tries again. He grabs Jerry through the open kitchen window. Jerry struggles to free his hands. Momo-sumo comes and chops Tom's backside. Tom yelps quickly, puts Jerry back and falls to the ground. When Tom puts pillow-like earmuffs on Momo-sumo, he dings to show Jerry that his guard can't hear his gong. After Tom dings the gong close to Momo-sumo's ear, Momo-sumo wakens and shoots Tom into the air. Tom yells in fear and claws the roof he landed on. It doesn't work, and he is teetering on the gutter's edge. Tom does a quick salute and falls. Then Tom takes a giant leap and lands on the roof. Tom, who was shaking in fear, heaves a sigh of relief. Jerry does everything he can to anger Tom, including making funny faces, showing him his (underwear-clad) buttocks, etc. It works, and the chase is off again. They run down the street into a toy store, where Jerry hides in a toy airplane. Jerry turns it on, pilots it, and scalps Tom's head and then shaves Tom's body with the propeller. As soon as Tom's fur comes back, the chase starts again. He gets into a larger toy airplane, chases Jerry's plane in a dogfight-like chase, and is shredding Jerry's plane with his propeller. Jerry gongs for Momo-sumo and Tom slams into Momo-sumo's chest, causing him (Tom) to disintegrate. Momo-sumo sweeps him up and throws him in a trash can. A panicked Tom calls an exterminator, Butch, along with three more cats to remove Momo-sumo from the household. They do nothing more than fire paintballs at Momo-sumo, who is thrown by the force into the swimming pool; Tom then breaks out laughing. However, Momo-sumo then grabs Tom and squashes him into a bowling ball which he uses to, literally, strike the cats out of the garden.

In the final scene, Jerry and Momo-sumo are watching television (which is showing the battered exterminator cats with Butch Cat opening his mouth and catching all his fallen teeth with his right hand) and eating popcorn, leading to Momo-sumo eating the whole popcorn and making Jerry ring the gong, but instead of Momo-sumo, there is Tom, who arrives to serve more popcorn to Jerry and Momo-sumo and to kiss Momo-sumo's feet to apologize for his ill-treatment toward Jerry and beg forgiveness, which Momo-sumo happily grants. The short draws to a close with Jerry happily diving into the popcorn and munching it.

Production 

The Karate Guard was directed by Tom and Jerry co-creator Joseph Barbera and Spike Brandt. It is Barbera's first Tom and Jerry short since he and his business partner William Hanna directed Tot Watchers and left the cartoon series nearly 50 years prior and before Hanna's death on March 22, 2001, as well as his last before his own death on December 18, 2006. This is not, however, Barbera's final Tom and Jerry project, as he would provide the story to the 2007 direct-to-DVD film Tom and Jerry: A Nutcracker Tale.

Barbera storyboarded The Karate Guard with Iwao Takamoto. The short was animated by Brandt, Dave Brewster, Tony Cervone, Michael Nickelson, Barry O'Donahue, Wendy Perdue, and Jeff Siergey. The music for the short was composed by Michael Giacchino; it was conducted by Tim Simonec and recorded at the Eastwood Scoring Stage on September 1, 2005.

Home media 
The Karate Guard is available as a bonus short on the DVDs Tom and Jerry Spotlight Collection Volume 3 and Tom and Jerry Deluxe Anniversary Collection.

Voice cast 
 Keone Young as Ancient Wise One
 Spike Brandt as Tom
 Tony Cervone as Butch
 Jill Talley as Jerry (uncredited)

See also 
 List of works produced by Hanna-Barbera Productions
 Tom and Jerry filmography

References

External links 
 
 

2005 films
2000s American animated films
2005 comedy films
2005 short films
2005 animated films
2005 martial arts films
Animated films about dogs
American martial arts films
Films directed by Spike Brandt
Films produced by Joseph Barbera
Films scored by Michael Giacchino
Films set in 2005
Short films directed by Joseph Barbera
Tom and Jerry short films
Warner Bros. Animation animated short films
2000s Warner Bros. animated short films
2000s English-language films